McKenzie Arena (also called "The Roundhouse") is the primary basketball arena for the University of Tennessee at Chattanooga (UTC) in Chattanooga in the U.S. state of Tennessee.  It replaced Maclellan Gymnasium, a 4,177-seat gymnasium now used for women's volleyball and wrestling.  Originally called UTC Arena, it was renamed McKenzie Arena on February 21, 2000, in honor of athletic supporters Toby and Brenda McKenzie of Cleveland, Tennessee. The arena opened on October 8, 1982. It was designed by Campbell & Associates Architects with David J. Moore as the on-site architect/construction administrator.

The first season included a visit by then defending NCAA national champion North Carolina Tar Heels, a team which included Michael Jordan, Brad Daugherty, and Sam Perkins. The arena hosted the 2005, 2009, and 2011 men's Southern Conference basketball tournament and the 2005, 2009, and 2011 women's tournament championship game. In addition to basketball, the arena has hosted many ice shows, rodeos, circuses, truck rallies, and wrestling events. The arena is also home to UTC's department of intercollegiate athletics. The arena also hosted the 2006 TSSAA State Wrestling tournament.

The arena can also accommodate concerts, with a  stage and capacities of 7,463 for side-stage shows, 9,107 end-stage and 11,557 center-stage shows; ice shows, circuses and even monster truck rallies (arena floor dimensions are 151'6" by 181'9").

The arena hosted WCW Halloween Havoc in 1991 and the thirteenth WWF In Your House pay-per-view  In Your House 13: Final Four in 1997. It also hosted Clash of the Champions IV,  the first Clash of Champions event produced by WCW.  World Wrestling Entertainment continues to hold matches at the arena.

In 2011, Winter Guard International made its first trip to McKenzie for the first annual WGI MidSouth Percussion Championship.

Terrell Owens also hosted his own induction ceremony into the Pro Football Hall of Fame here on August 4, 2018.

See also
 Finley Stadium
 List of NCAA Division I basketball arenas

References

External links
 
 McKenzie Arena info (from GoMocs.com)

1982 establishments in Tennessee
Basketball venues in Tennessee
Chattanooga Mocs basketball
College basketball venues in the United States
Sports venues in Chattanooga, Tennessee
Sports venues completed in 1982
Wrestling venues in Tennessee
Indoor arenas in Tennessee